Mantineion was a town of ancient Bithynia, inhabited in Roman and Byzantine times. 

Its site is located near Ada Köy, Asiatic Turkey.

References

Populated places in Bithynia
Former populated places in Turkey
Roman towns and cities in Turkey
History of Bolu Province
Populated places of the Byzantine Empire